Richard Parker is a former professional rugby league footballer who played in the 1960s. He played at club level for Castleford (Heritage № 491).

Playing career

County League appearances
Richard Parker played in Castleford's victory in the Yorkshire County League during the 1964–65 season.

References

External links
Search for "Parker" at rugbyleagueproject.org
Richard Parker Memory Box Search at archive.castigersheritage.com
Ricky Parker Memory Box Search at archive.castigersheritage.com

Living people
Castleford Tigers players
English rugby league players
Place of birth missing (living people)
Year of birth missing (living people)